93rd Street runs from Riverside Drive, overlooking the Hudson River, to the East River, through the New York City borough of Manhattan. It traverses the neighborhoods of the Upper West Side, Upper East Side, Carnegie Hill, and Yorkville; the street is interrupted by Central Park. 

A notable monument to Joan of Arc by Anna Hyatt Huntington stands at the street's western terminus at Riverside Park.

Notable buildings

 Columbia Grammar & Preparatory School
 161 West 93rd Street, built by the Nippon Club
 The Spence School occupies the former  William Goadby and Florence Baker Loew House.
 Congregation Shaare Zedek, in a handsome Neoclassical building from 1922.
 The Joan of Arc Junior High School in a handsome Art Deco building between Amsterdam and Columbus.
 The handsome Gothic Revival Lutheran Church of the Advent, 1900, on the northeast corner of Broadway.
 75 E 93rd St - Synod of the Russian Orthodox Church Outside Russia - formerly the Francis Palmer House / George F Baker Mansion -- the former mansion of General Winfield Scott was located here as well
 60 East 93rd Street- Formerly the Virginia Graham Fair Vanderbilt house. The mansion now serves as a gallery for Carlton Hobbs LLC, an antique dealer specializing in fine European furniture and works of art.

The 93rd Street Beautification Association works to preserve and enhance the street where it runs through Carnegie Hill.

Notable residents

 Marx Brothers lived here at 179 East 93rd Street.
 Jackie Robinson lived at 33 West 93rd Street for a year and a half in the 1960s.

References

External links
Joan of Arc - New York City Statues

093